Yves Robert (19 June 1920 – 10 May 2002) was a French actor, screenwriter, director, and producer.

Life and career
Robert was born in Saumur, Maine-et-Loire, France. In his teens, he went to Paris to pursue a career in acting, starting with unpaid parts on stage in the city's various theatre workshops. From ages 12–20 he set type as a typographer, then studied mime in his early 20s. In 1948 he made his motion picture debut with one of the secondary roles in the film, Les Dieux du dimanche. Within a few years, Robert was writing scripts, directing, and producing.

Yves Robert's directorial efforts included several successful comedies for which he had written the screenplay. His 1962 film, La Guerre des boutons won France's Prix Jean Vigo. His 1972 film Le grand blond avec une chaussure noire won the Silver Bear at the 23rd Berlin International Film Festival in 1973. In 1976, Un éléphant ça trompe énormément, starring his wife, earned him international acclaim. Robert's 1973 devastating comedy Salut l'artiste is considered by many performers to be the ultimate film about the humiliations of the actor's life. In 1977, he directed another comedy, Nous irons tous au paradis, which was nominated for a César Award for Best Film.

In 1990, Robert directed two dramatic films, My Mother's Castle (Le château de ma mère) and My Father's Glory (La Gloire de mon Père). Based on autobiographical novels by Marcel Pagnol, they were jointly voted "Best Film" at the 1991 Seattle International Film Festival, and received rave reviews. Over his career, he directed more than twenty feature-length motion pictures, wrote an equal number of scripts, and acted in more than seventy-five films. Although his last major role was perhaps in 1980, A Bad Son by Claude Sautet, as the working-class father of a drug-dealer, he continued acting past 1997.

Robert played opposite Danièle Delorme in the 1951 play Colombe (Dove) by Jean Anouilh. They married in 1956, and jointly formed the film production company La Guéville in 1961. La Guéville also released several films by Monty Python and Terry Gilliam, which was very influential into establishing the comedy troupe to French audiences. He died in Paris on 10 May 2002 from a cerebral hemorrhage. He was buried in Montparnasse Cemetery with the epitaph "A man of joy ...", where visitors leave buttons of many colors.He was survived by Danièle and two children, Anne and Jean-Denis Robert, by first wife, actress Rosy Varte. That month's Cannes Film Festival paid homage to his contribution to French film.

Selected filmography
Director
 Les hommes ne pensent qu'à ça (1954)
 Neither Seen Nor Recognized  (1958)
 Signé Arsène Lupin (Signed, Arsene Lupin) (1959)
 The Fenouillard Family (1960)
 La Guerre des boutons (War of the Buttons) (1962)
 Bebert and the Train (1964)
  (1965) – 4 songs on 45 RPM vinyl 
 Monnaie de singe (Monkey Money) (1966)
 Alexandre le bienheureux (Very Happy Alexander) (1968)
 Clérambard (1969)
 Le grand blond avec une chaussure noire (The Tall Blonde Man with One Black Shoe) (1972)
 Salut l'artiste (Hail the Artist) (1973)
 Le Retour du Grand Blond (The Return of the Tall Blond Man with One Black Shoe) (1974)
 Un éléphant ça trompe énormément (Pardon Mon Affaire) (1976) 
 Nous irons tous au paradis (Pardon Mon Affaire, Too!) (1977)
 Courage - Let's Run (1979)
 Le Jumeau (The Twin) (1984)
 La Gloire de mon Père (My Father's Glory) (1990)
 Le château de ma mère (My Mother's Castle) (1990)
  (1992)
 Montparnasse-Pondichéry (1994)

Actor

 Les dieux du dimanche (1949) - Guillot
 Le tampon du capiston (1950) - Pastini
 Three Telegrams (1950) - Sergent Gaston Chauvin
 Bibi Fricotin (1951) - Antoine Gardon
 The Red Rose (1951) - Yves Gérard
 Juliette, or Key of Dreams (1953) - L'accordéoniste
 Two Pennies Worth of Violets (1951) - Charlot
 Follow That Man (1953) - Inspecteur Paulhan
 Virgile (1953) - Esposito
 Les hommes ne pensent qu'à ça (1954) - L'ancien combattant / Un marcheur
 Service Entrance (1954) - Courbessac
 School for Love (1955) - Clément
 Bad Liaisons (1955) - L'inspecteur Forbin
 The Grand Maneuver (1955) - Le lieutenant Félix Leroy
 Folies-Bergère (1956) - Jeff
 The Terror with Women (1956) - Le journaliste Labarge
 Les Truands (1957) - Amédée Benoit / Son père
 Neither Seen Nor Recognized (1958) - Le photographe (uncredited)
  (1958) - Christian
 Nina (1959) - Redon-Namur
 Le petit prof (1959) - Docteur Aubin
 The Green Mare (1959) - Zèphe Maloret
 Signé Arsène Lupin (1959) - La Ballu
 La Brune que voilà (1960) - Le mécanicien
 Love and the Frenchwoman (1960) - Traveller (segment "Mariage, Le")
 The Fenouillard Family (1961) - Le Coq (uncredited)
 The End of Belle (1961) - Le barman / Bartender
 Cléo from 5 to 7 (1962) - Le vendeur de mouchoirs (uncredited)
 Bébert et l'Omnibus (1963) - Chaussin - l'amant d'Henriette (uncredited)
 La communale (1965) - L'oncle Henri
 King of Hearts (1966) - Le général Baderna (uncredited)
 An Idiot in Paris (1967) - Marcel Pitou, l'évadé des HLM / Man by the Seine
 The Most Beautiful Month (1968) - Le cheminot
 Clérambard (1969) - Le dragon qui entre chez la Langouste (uncredited)
 Le pistonné (1970) - Monsieur Langmann - le père
 Le Voyou (1970) - Le commissaire
 Distracted (1970) - Le locataire (uncredited)
 Le cinéma de papa (1971) - Henri Roger Langmann
 Le cri du cormoran, le soir au-dessus des jonques (1971) - Le commissaire
 Le Viager (1972) - Bucigny-Dumaine (le bel officier)
 Les malheurs d'Alfred (1972) - L'observateur parisien
 L'aventure, c'est l'aventure (1972) - L'avocat de la défense
 Dear Louise (1972) - Magnetto, le marchand de cycles
 Repeated Absences (1972) - Le père de François
 The Tall Blond Man with One Black Shoe (1972) - Le chef d'orchestre (uncredited)
 La raison du plus fou (1973) - Le contrôleur des chemins de fer
 Hail the Artist (1973) - Le metteur en scène de théâtre (uncredited)
 La grande Paulette (1974) - Le voyageur
 The Return of the Tall Blond Man with One Black Shoe (1974) - Le chef d'orchestre (uncredited)
 Section spéciale (1975) - Émile Bastard
 Trop c'est trop (1975)
 The Judge and the Assassin (1976) - Prof. Degueldre
 Little Marcel (1976) - Le commissaire Mancini
 Ils sont grands, ces petits (1979) - Le père de Louise
 Woman Between Wolf and Dog (1979) - Werkman
 A Bad Son (1980) - René Calgagni
 Le rose et le blanc (1982) - Le barman des Caraïbes
 Vive la sociale! (1983) - Jojo, le père
 Waiter! (1983) - Simon
 The Twin (1984) - L'homme dans l'ascenseur (uncredited)
 Billy Ze Kick (1985) - Alcide
 Le Débutant (1986) - L'homme dans l'escalier (uncredited)
 Fucking Fernand (1987) - Le récitant des actualités (voice)
 Cher frangin (1989) - M. Durand, le patron d'Alain
 Le crime d'Antoine (1989) - Pilou
 Le bal des casse-pieds (1992) - (uncredited)
 Les eaux dormantes (1992) - Le père (voice)
 La Crise (1992) - M. Barelle
 Montparnasse-Pondichéry (1994) - Léo
 Le nez au vent (1995) - Paphaël
 Sortez des rangs (1996) - Le marchand de marrons (uncredited)
 Disparus (1998) - Blaise (âgé)

Producer
 Les petits câlins (1978)
 The Crying Woman (1979)

Reissues and remakes
His black and white adaptation of the book La Guerre des Boutons having sold nearly 10 million tickets at the French box office in 1962, was hugely popular, and planned for a nationwide reissue 12 October 2011.

Some films were also re-made in Hollywood. The Tall Blond Man with One Black Shoe (1972), a spy spoof featuring the physical comedic skills of Pierre Richard, became The Man with One Red Shoe (1985) with Tom Hanks. Pardon Mon Affaire (1976), a sexy farce with Jean Rochefort, became The Woman in Red (1984).

DVD releases
 La Gloire de Mon Pere + Le Chateau de Ma Mere (Restored) 1990–1991 2002, 2005 & 2012  Blu-ray 
 The Tall Blond Man with One Black Shoe + The Return of the Tall Blond Man 1972, 1974  
 Ni vu..., ni connu... (1958) 2009

References

External links

 Clips from La Gloire de mon Père (My Father's Glory) 1990
 Yves Robert in French Wiki

Bibliography
 Yves Robert. Un homme de joie. Dialogue avec Jérôme Tonnerre, Paris, Flammarion, 1996, 394 p.

1920 births
2002 deaths
People from Saumur
French male film actors
French film directors
French film producers
French male screenwriters
20th-century French screenwriters
French male television actors
French male voice actors
Troupe of the Comédie-Française
Burials at Montparnasse Cemetery
20th-century French male writers